Henri de Bourbon, Duke of Montpensier, (12 May 1573 – 27 February 1608) was Dauphin of Auvergne, Duke of Montpensier, Sovereign Prince of the Dombes and Lord of Châtellerault.

Henri was born at Mézières, the son  of François de Bourbon, Duke of Montpensier, and of his wife Renée d'Anjou, marquise de Mézières.

On 15 May 1597, Henri married  Henriette Catherine, daughter of Henri de Joyeuse and Catherine de Nogaret.  They had:
 Marie de Bourbon, Duchess of Montpensier (15 October 1605 – 4 June 1627); married Gaston, Duke of Orléans and was the mother of La Grande Mademoiselle (with Marie dying as a result of complications from the birth of her daughter). Her daughter never married and died childless in 1693 and thus Marie has no surviving descendants today.

References

Sources

House of Bourbon
House of Bourbon (France)
Princes of the Dombes
Dukes of Montpensier
Dauphins of Auvergne
1573 births
1608 deaths
16th-century French people
17th-century French people
16th-century peers of France
17th-century peers of France